James or Jim Berger may refer to:

 James S. Berger (1903–1984), United States Republican State Senator from Pennsylvania
 Jim Berger (statistician) (born 1950), American statistician
 James M. Berger (born 1968), American biophysicist and biophysical chemist